The 2012–13 Biathlon World Cup – World Cup 8 was held in Sochi, Russia, from 7 March until 10 March 2013.

Schedule of events

Medal winners

Men

Women

Achievements

 Best performance for all time

 , 3rd place in Individual
 , 4th place in Individual
 , 6th place in Individual
 , 27th place in Individual and 9th in Sprint
 , 33rd place in Individual
 , 38th place in Individual
 , 46th place in Individual
 , 59th place in Individual
 , 96th place in Individual
 , 3rd place in Sprint
 , 5th place in Sprint
 , 20th place in Sprint
 , 39th place in Sprint
 , 13th place in Individual
 , 14th place in Individual
 , 19th place in Individual
 , 25th place in Individual
 , 40th place in Individual
 , 43rd place in Individual
 , 66th place in Individual
 , 83rd place in Individual
 , 87th place in Individual
 , 6th place in Sprint
 , 37th place in Sprint
 , 43rd place in Sprint
 , 57th place in Sprint

 First World Cup race

 , 45th place in Individual
 , 58th place in Sprint

References 

World Cup 8
2013 in Russian sport
March 2013 sports events in Europe
World Cup - World Cup 8,2012-13
Sports competitions in Sochi
2012 Biathlon World Cup - World Cup 8